Dashti Bolagh (also Romanized as Dāshtī Bolāgh; also known as Dāshlī Bolāgh and Dāshtī Bolāghī) is a village in Satar Rural District, Kolyai District, Sonqor County, Kermanshah Province, Iran. At the 2006 census, its population was 504, in 128 families.

References 

Populated places in Sonqor County